Richard Rodgers School refers to several schools named after the American composer Richard Rodgers, including these two in New York City:

 PS 96 Richard Rodgers School, the Bronx
 PS 166 Richard Rodgers School of Arts & Technology, Manhattan

External links
 PS 166 Richard Rodgers School of Arts & Technology,  Manhattan, New York, NY website